This is a list of vice presidents of the United States by time in office. The basis of the list is the difference between dates. The length of a full four-year  term of office amounts to 1,461 days (three common years of 365 days plus one leap year of 366 days). If counted by number of calendar days all the figures would be one greater.

Since 1789, there have been 49 people sworn into office as Vice President of the United States. Of these, nine succeeded to the presidency during their term, seven died while in office, and two resigned. Since the adoption of the Twenty-fifth Amendment to the United States Constitution (February 10, 1967), when there is a vacancy in the office of the vice president, the president nominates a successor who takes office upon confirmation by a majority vote of both Houses of Congress.

Vice presidents by time in office

Notes

See also
 Acting President of the United States
 List of presidents of the United States by time in office
 United States presidential line of succession

References

Time in office
United States, Vice Presidents